UFC 170: Rousey vs. McMann was a mixed martial arts held on February 22, 2014, at the Mandalay Bay Events Center in Las Vegas, Nevada.

The event was released on DVD on May 27, 2014. The DVD was distributed by Anchor Bay Entertainment.

Background
A bout between women's bantamweight champion and former Olympian Ronda Rousey and former Olympian Sara McMann headlined the event.

A bout between Gilbert Melendez and Khabib Nurmagomedov was briefly linked to this event.  The fight was later cancelled.

Lucas Martins was expected to face Bryan Caraway at this event. However, Caraway pulled out of the bout citing an injury and was replaced by UFC newcomer Aljamain Sterling. Martins ended up also getting injured and was replaced by UFC newcomer Cody Gibson.

Francisco Rivera was expected to face Raphael Assunção on this card. However, Rivera injured his hand and was forced out of the bout. He was replaced by UFC newcomer Pedro Munhoz.

A bout between Rafael dos Anjos and Rustam Khabilov was expected to take place on this card. However, the fight was cancelled due to injury.

A bout between Rashad Evans and Daniel Cormier was expected to take place on this card.  However, the fight was removed from this card due to Evans suffering a knee injury during training. He was replaced by undefeated newcomer and Strikeforce veteran Patrick Cummins.

Results

Bonus awards
The following fighters were awarded $50,000 bonuses:
 Fight of the Night: Rory MacDonald vs. Demian Maia
 Performance of the Night: Ronda Rousey and Stephen Thompson

Reported payout
The following is the reported payout to the fighters as reported to the Nevada State Athletic Commission. It does not include sponsor money and also does not include the UFC's traditional "fight night" bonuses.
 Ronda Rousey: $110,000 (includes $55,000 win bonus) def. Sara McMann: $16,000
 Daniel Cormier: $160,000 (includes $80,000 win bonus) def. Patrick Cummins: $8,000
 Rory MacDonald: $100,000 (includes $50,000 win bonus) def. Demian Maia: $64,000
 Mike Pyle: $96,000 (includes $48,000 win bonus) def. T.J. Waldburger: $18,000
 Stephen Thompson: $28,000 (includes $14,000 win bonus) def. Robert Whittaker: $15,000
 Alexis Davis: $30,000 (includes $15,000 win bonus) def. Jessica Eye: $8,000
 Raphael Assunção: $56,000 (includes $28,000 win bonus) def. Pedro Muhnoz: $8,000
 Aljamain Sterling: $16,000 (includes $8,000 win bonus) def. Cody Gibson: $8,000
 Zach Makovsky: $24,000 (includes $12,000 win bonus) def. Josh Sampo: $10,000
 Erik Koch: $30,000 (includes $15,000 win bonus) def. Rafaello Oliveira: $14,000
 Ernest Chavez: $16,000 (includes $8,000 win bonus) def. Yosdenis Cedeno: $8,000

See also
List of UFC events
2014 in UFC

References

Ultimate Fighting Championship events
2014 in mixed martial arts
Mixed martial arts in Las Vegas
2014 in sports in Nevada